Francisco Álvaro Bueno de Paiva (17 September 1861 – 4 August 1928) was a Brazilian politician who was Vice President of Brazil from 11 November 1920 to 14 November 1922 under Epitácio Pessoa. As the ninth vice president of Brazil, he also served as the President of the Senate.

References

1861 births
1928 deaths
20th-century Brazilian people
Vice presidents of Brazil
Presidents of the Federal Senate (Brazil)
People from Minas Gerais

Coffee with milk politics politicians